The 2nd Infantry Brigade is an infantry brigade of the Estonian Land Forces. It is the primary military unit in Southern Estonia. The brigade headquarters is currently based at Sirgu village, Luunja Parish, Tartu County. The brigade is tasked with planning and organizing military operations, planning and organizing mobilization, ensuring the readiness and support of its subordinate units, preparing wartime reserve units and their formation, organizing the training and participation in international military operations.

History 
The 2nd Infantry Brigade follows in the tradition of the Sakala Partisan Regiment, which was formed on December 25, 1918. The unit was initially named the Sakala Partisan Battalion. It was manned by volunteers and based out of Tartu. In 1919, it became a regiment. The unit received its flag on December 31, 1919. The regiment fought numerous battles on the southern front in the Estonian War of Independence, under Petseri, Võru, Tartu and Viljandi. After the war, the unit became a reserve infantry regiment.

On August 1, 2014, the Southern Defence District was reorganized into the 2nd Infantry Brigade. On September 9, 2015, lieutenant colonel Eero Rebo replaced lieutenant colonel Enno Mõts as the brigades commander. Enno Mõts had been the commander of the unit since 2014. On April 19, 2016, the 2nd Infantry Brigade received the flag of the former Sakala Partisan Regiment. Current commander of the 2nd Infantry Brigade is Colonel Mati Tikerpuu (since June 2022).

Structure 

The current peacetime structure of the 2nd Infantry Brigade consists of headquarters, Kuperjanov Infantry Battalion, Combat Service Support Battalion and HQ and Signal Company. The headquarters is led by a chief of staff, who is directly subordinate to the brigade commander. The headquarters consists of a personnel section (S1), intelligence and security section (S2), operations and training section (S3/7), logistics section (S4), signals section (S6) and finance section (S8). It is tasked with providing the brigade commander with necessary information for planning and analysing brigade's training, activities and operations, planning and preparing mobilization, maintaining combat readiness and coordinating activities with other units of the Estonian Defence Forces, as well as organizing civil-military co-operation. The brigade is preparing reserve units through training of conscripts, which allows the formation of wartime and reserve units. The combat service support battalion is tasked with providing administrative and logistics support for training, plus preparing and executing the formation of wartime and reserve units. The battalion commanders are directly subordinate to the brigade commander.

Peacetime structure 

 Brigade Headquarters (Luunja Parish)
 HQ Support and Signal Company (Taara Army Base, Võru)
 Kuperjanov Infantry Battalion (Taara Army Base, Võru)
 Combat Service Support Battalion (Taara Army Base, Võru)

Wartime structure
The 2nd Infantry Brigade will continue to activate further units to reach full strength by 2022 at the latest and in the end will consist of the following units.

 Brigade Headquarters 
 21st Infantry Battalion (reserve)
 22nd Infantry Battalion (reserve)
 23rd Infantry Battalion (reserve)
 25th Artillery Battalion (reserve)
 26th Air Defence Battalion  (reserve)
 27th Engineer Battalion (reserve)
 Combat Service Support Battalion
 Reconnaissance Company (reserve)
 Anti-Tank Company (reserve)
 HQ and Signal Company

See also
Estonian Land Forces
1st Infantry Brigade
Taara Army Base

References

External links
Description of the brigade, Estonian Defence Forces

Infantry brigades of Estonia
Military units and formations established in 2014
2014 establishments in Estonia